Scooter Girl may refer to
Scooter Girl (comics), a comic miniseries by Chynna Clugston
"Scooter Girl", a song by Shaun Ryder from his 2003 solo album, Amateur Night in the Big Top

See also